Much Ado About Mousing is a 1964 Tom and Jerry short directed and produced by Chuck Jones. It was the second short to be produced by Jones, but the fourth released.

Plot
The cartoon starts with Tom fishing on a pier. Tom baits the line with "cheese" and casts it all the way out to a far-off ship and into Jerry's mouse hole. The cat gets a bite and gets pulled off the pier and onto a pillar, while the sleeping mouse nibbles at the "cheese". Unbeknownst to him, the "cheese" is in reality, legally rubber. Tom catches the mouse in a fish net and plops him onto the pier, waking Jerry up with a start.

Jerry then gets a sense of his surroundings, and realizes that Tom is holding his tail and he is about to squash him with a hammer. The mouse substitutes the cat's hand for himself, and Jerry whistles at Tom from the closest pillar to alert him of his throbbing hand. Tom reacts by yelping and jumping into the stratosphere, kissing his hand all the while. Pleased with himself, Jerry starts to run back to another mouse hole while Tom nosedives after him like a plane landing. Jerry makes it to safety while the cat hits his head on the fence, just above the hole.

Tom rounds a turn, and just as fast, stops and retreats behind the corner. The camera pans to Jerry, who is perched on top of a dog. He hides in the dog's mouth as Tom tries to catch him without waking up the dog. Instead of grabbing the mouse, however, Tom grabs the dog's tongue. Jerry has been pulled out as well and escapes, leaving the cat facing an angry and awake dog. Tom grins and rolls up the dog's tongue back into his mouth, then moves the dog's lips to change his expression to a smile. Tom then waves the dog goodbye and attempts to run away in fear. Not one to let Tom off so easily, the dog undoes his smile, grabs Tom's tail, rolls him up like a bowing ball, and bowls him through some garbage cans and into the water, where a crab pinches Tom's tail hard. Tom leaps out in pain and knocks the crab back into the water.

Soon, Tom spots a smaller dog being chased by a dog catcher. Tom forcibly grabs the dogcatcher's net and drags him to the dog, who is captured instead, knowing that he is Jerry's protector. Jerry, who wants to be protected by the dog, angrily gets a saw in a tool shed, hides behind the fence, and cuts the shaft of the net as the dogcatcher passes by. In gratitude, the dog gives Jerry a whistle to use whenever he's in trouble. Jerry, with relish, thinks of the fun times he could have with provoking Tom.

Jerry walks past a wooden box while Tom pokes his hand out of it and captures the mouse, who promptly whistles for his guardian. Tom is forcibly pulled through the knot hole and is being confronted by the mad dog. Tom grins, but soon his lips make a whistling gesture and he is exposed. The dog chokes Tom and the cat's mouth opens to reveal Jerry whistling on top of Tom's tongue. The mouse walks off and onto the dog's shoulder while the entire bowling sequence, complete with crab, is repeated.

Finally, Tom sneaks behind the fence and leans over it to place earmuffs over the sleeping dog. However, his feet cause a board to creak out of place, leaving him dangling over the dog as it continues to fall. Tom saves himself by curling his tail around the foundation of the fence such that he and the board are pulled back up to the fence. Tom makes noises to test the earmuffs, and when the dog stays asleep, he happily goes off to corner Jerry. Jerry blows his whistle while Tom only looks more menacing than before, but then Jerry pulls out a pair of earmuffs for himself and continues whistling. Thinking that Jerry stole the dog's earmuffs, Tom gets so scared that he rolls himself into a ball and bowls off the pier, and even grabs the crab and attaches it to his tail. However, in the final scene, Jerry then puts that pair on as he lies down next to the dog (who still had his earmuffs on) to take a nap.

Crew
Executive Producer: Walter Bien
Story: Michael Maltese
Animation: Ben Washam, Ken Harris, Don Towsley, Tom Ray, & Dick Thompson.
Backgrounds: Philip DeGuard
Music: Eugene Poddany
In Charge of Production: Les Goldman
Co-Director & Layouts: Maurice Noble
Vocal Effects: Mel Blanc
Produced & Directed by Chuck Jones

Production notes
The name is a pun of the William Shakespeare comedy, Much Ado About Nothing.

External links

1964 films
1964 short films
1964 animated films
1960s animated short films
Tom and Jerry short films
Short films directed by Chuck Jones
Films directed by Maurice Noble
Films scored by Eugene Poddany
1960s American animated films
1964 comedy films
Animated films without speech
Metro-Goldwyn-Mayer short films
Metro-Goldwyn-Mayer animated short films
American comedy short films
Animated films about dogs
MGM Animation/Visual Arts short films
Films with screenplays by Michael Maltese